The influence of Countess Elizabeth Báthory in popular culture has been notable from the 18th century to the present day.  Since her death, various myths and legends surrounding her story have preserved her as a prominent figure in folklore, literature, music, film, games and toys.

In folklore and literature
The case of Countess Elizabeth Báthory inspired numerous stories and fairy tales. 18th and 19th century writers liberally added or omitted elements of the narrative. The most common motif of these works was that of the countess bathing in her victims' blood in order to retain beauty or youth. Frequently, the cruel countess would discover the secret of blood bathing when she slapped a female servant in rage, splashing parts of her own skin with blood. Upon removal of the blood, that portion of skin would seem younger and more beautiful than before.

This legend appeared in print for the first time in 1729, in the Jesuit scholar László Turóczi's Tragica Historia, the first written account of the Báthory case.

When quoting him in his 1742 history book, Matthias Bel was sceptical about this particular detail, he nevertheless helped the legend to spread. Subsequent writers of history and fiction alike often identified vanity as the sole motivation for Báthory's crimes.

Modern historians Radu Florescu and Raymond T. McNally have concluded that the theory Báthory murdered on account of her vanity sprang up from contemporary prejudices about gender roles. Women were not believed to be capable of violence for its own sake.  At the beginning of the 19th century, the vanity motif was first questioned, and sadistic pleasure was considered a far more plausible motive for Báthory's crimes. In 1817, the witness accounts (which had surfaced in 1765) were published for the first time, demonstrating that the bloodbaths or blood seeker for vanity aspect of Báthory's crimes were legend rather than fact.

The legend nonetheless persisted in the popular imagination. Some versions of the story were told with the purpose of denouncing female vanity, while other versions aimed to entertain or thrill their audience. Some versions of the story incorporated even more elaborate torture chamber fantasies than recorded history could provide, such as the use of an iron maiden, which were not based on the evidence from Báthory's trial. Leopold von Sacher-Masoch, whose name inspired the term masochism, was inspired by the Báthory legend to write his 1874 novella Ewige Jugend ("eternal youth")

Bathory also appears as the main antagonist in the novel Dracula the Un-dead, a sequel to Bram Stoker's classic novel by his great-grandnephew Dacre Stoker and Ian Holt. In the book, she is cousin to Count Dracula and was the motive behind his decision to move to London in the original novel, as she was murdering women under the guise of Jack the Ripper and he swore to stop her.

The historical novel The Countess by Rebecca Johns tells a first-person fictionalized account of Báthory's life from her prison cell at Csejthe Castle.  In the book, she tells her son, Pál, the story of her life, explaining her behavior toward her servants as punishment for their disloyalty.

In the final 2 books of the Well-Behaved Women Series, Báthory is featured as the primary antagonist. In this series she is portrayed as a villain focused on revenge and taking over a sort of purgatory for exceptional women known as Transition.

Vampire myth
The emergence of the bloodbath or blood seeker for vanity myth coincided with the vampire scares that haunted Europe in the early 18th century, reaching even into educated and scientific circles, but the strong connection between the bloodbath or blood seeker myth and the vampiric myth was not made until the 1970s. The first connections were made to promote works of fiction by linking them to the already commercially successful Dracula story. Thus, a 1970 movie based on Báthory and the bloodbath or blood seeker for vanity myth was titled Countess Dracula.

Some Báthory biographers, McNally in particular, have tried to establish the bloodbath myth and the historical Elizabeth Báthory as a source of influence for Bram Stoker's 1897 novel Dracula, pointing to similarities in settings and motifs and the fact that Stoker might have read about her. This theory is strongly disputed by author Elizabeth Miller.

Meanwhile, Báthory has become an influence for modern vampire literature and vampire films. The story, while retaining the essential facts, receives an imaginative interpretation in the horror novelist Syra Bond's Cold Blood.

Literature
 In Robert Statzer's novel To Love a Vampire, a vampiric Elizabeth Bathory encounters a young Abraham Van Helsing, the hero of Bram Stoker's Dracula, during his days as a medical student. Originally published as a serial in the pages of Scary Monsters Magazine from March 2011 to June 2013, a revised version of To Love a Vampire was reprinted in paperback and Kindle editions in June 2018.
 She is a character in the 2018 novel On Devil's Wings by M. J. Meade.
 She is the main protagonist of the 2010 novel The Countess by Rebecca Johns.
 Character in 2013 story "The Prayer of Ninety Cats" by Caitlin R. Kiernan.
 She is depicted as one of the reincarnations of the demoness Lilith in the fiction novel Demoness (2015) by Martin Kage.
 Ewige Jugend by Leopold von Sacher-Masoch.
 The Dracula Archives (1971) by Raymond Rudorff is a vampire novel that features Báthory.
 Our Lady of Pain (1974) by John Blackburn is a supernatural horror novel whose plot revolves around a play about Báthory being staged in modern Britain.
 Hungarian novella Én, Báthory Erzsébet (I, Elizabeth Báthory) by Mária P. Szabó (2010)
 Historic novel Báthory Erzsébet (1940) by Hungarian writer Kálmán Vándor.
 Erzsébet Báthory appears as a character in the Hungarian novel Ördögszekér (The Devil's Wagon) published in 1925 by Sándor Makkai, a bishop of the Hungarian Reformed Church in Transylvania.  The novel is about the incestuous relationship of Gábor Báthory and his younger sister Anna, who were adopted into the household of István Báthory, the older brother of Erzsébet.
 Short story Csejtevár és asszonya (The Lady of Castle Csejte) by Hungarian writer Kálmán Mikszáth.
 The short story "A Stab at Forever", by American writer Michelle Augello-Page, fictionalizes Erzsébet Báthory's earliest known experiences of violence towards young girls as something horrifically and humanly female, based in jealousy, a fear of growing old, a sadistic expression of sexual power, and an obsession with youth. 
 Bathory: Memoir of a Countess is a novel by A. Mordeaux.
Elisabeth Bathory is the main character in the modern vampire novella "Love Bites" by Kyt Wright.
 Báthory is a major antagonist in the alternative history/fantasy novels This Rough Magic and Much Fall of Blood by Eric Flint, Dave Freer and Mercedes Lackey. She is portrayed as a sorceress and Satanist as opposed to a vampire.
 Báthory is the ancestor of protagonist Christopher Csejthe in the Half/Life series of novels by Wm. Mark Simmons and figures prominently in the second book, Dead on My Feet, with a plot twist that hinges on the questionable innocence of Katarina Beneczky (Katalin Benick) among the Countess' collaborators.
 Báthory is a major character, depicted as a half-breed vampire, in Daughter of the Night by Elaine Bergstrom.
 The Blood Countess is a novel by Andrei Codrescu.
 The Bloody Countess by Argentinian writer Alejandra Pizarnik was a short Gothic work of fiction (1968, reprinted in The Oxford Book of Gothic Tales, ed. Chris Baldick)
 In the science fiction short story Rumfuddle by Jack Vance, a baby who would have grown up to be Elizabeth Báthory is taken to a different time and place in history.
 In the novel 62: A Model Kit by Julio Cortázar, the countess and her story are recurring themes.
 In David Eddings' series The Elenium a villainous character called Lady Bellina, who revels in the torture and killing of young women, lives in a castle with an evil reputation, and is bricked into her room as a punishment, is based on Bathory.
 The novella "Sanguinarius" by Ray Russell is a fictional account of the deeds of Countess Bathory, told in the first person.
 Colombian writer Ricardo Abdahllah has written several pieces of short fiction around Bathory's myth.
 In the novel Daughters of the Moon by Joseph Curtin, she is portrayed as coming back to life as a vampire and takes the name of Lizabet Bazore. She also preys upon a guitarist for an upcoming rock band, GloryDaze, named Vincenzio "Vinnie the Razor" Rosario.
 In the Buffy the Vampire Slayer book Tales of the Slayer Vol. 1, she is the villain in the story "Die Blutgrafin".
 The 2006 novel The Blood Confession by Alisa M. Libby is a revisionist portrayal.
 Báthory's legend is used as a basis for the Japanese anime Ghost Hunt'''s seventh file/case mystery "Blood-Soaked Labyrinth", shown from episode 18–21.
 In the novel Anno Dracula Báthory appears as a relative of Dracula.
 "The Trouble with the Pears" by Gia Bathory Al Babel.
 Ella, Drácula ("She, Dracula") by Javier García Sánchez, Spanish writer. 2002.
 The 2007 Brazilian novel O Legado de Bathory by Alexandre Heredia.
 She appears, 'resurrected' as a vampire, in the latter books of The Vampire Huntress Legend Series by L. A. Banks
 In the Nantucket series of science fiction by S.M. Stirling, archvillainess Dr. Alice Hong seems to be based partly on Bathory and one character in the series makes a reference to this similarity.
 Finnish detective novel 2008 Unkarilainen taulu ("The Hungarian Painting") by Mikko Karppi
 She appears as the main villain in Dracula the Un-Dead, written by Dacre Stoker (Bram's great-grandnephew) and Ian Holt.
  Báthory is featured prominently in Lord of the Vampires, the third installment of The Diaries of the Family Dracul by Jeanne Kalogridis. In the novel, she is imagined as one of the Brides of Dracula. Dracula frequently addresses her as "cousin".
 In the 2010 novel, Abraham Lincoln, Vampire Hunter, by Seth Grahame-Smith, it is revealed that she was a vampire. After her trial, persecution against vampires in Europe skyrocketed, driving them to settle en masse in the New World.
 Báthory is described as the daughter of Dracula and appears as one of the main protagonists in Modern Marvels – Viktoriana by Wayne Reinagel (2011)
 Báthory is the name of the High School where the protagonist of the novel, Vladimir Tod, goes to in The Chronicles of Vladimir Tod by Heather Brewer
 Báthory is encountered by the band of protagonists while she is imprisoned in Hell in the novel Damned by Chuck Palahniuk.
 In The Parasol Protectorate series by Gail Carriger, one of the primary vampire characters is Countess Nadasdy. Nádasdy was Báthory's married name.
 Báthory is the main villain in the novel The Blood Countess by Tara Moss.
 She is mentioned in a light novel Death Note Another Note: The Los Angeles BB Murder Cases, when Ryuuzaki/L mentions the bathtub being so ruined by blood, the only person who would dream of climbing in is Elizabeth Bathory.
 The story of Elizabeth Bathory is entangled with a major character's backstory in James Rollins and Rebecca Cantrell's The Blood Gospel, part of their Order of the Sanguines series.
 In George R. R. Martin's A Song of Ice and Fire series of novels, a character named "Mad" Danelle Lothston is rumored to have stolen children from the lands surrounding her castle, Harrenhal, and bathed in their blood, likely inspired by the historical record of Bathory.
 She is the main antagonist in Vangelis Garofallou's novel in The Baths of the Countess (2017).
 In Alexis Henderson's House of Hunger (2022), she is reimagined as a countess, Lisavet Bathory, who drinks the blood of her servants.

Poetry
 Báthori Erzsébet by Hungarian poet János Garay.
 Báthory Erzsébet: történeti beszély két énekben (Erzsébet Báthory: Historical Tale in Two Cantos) (1847) by Hungarian poet Sándor Vachott.
 The Blood Countess, Erzsébet Báthory of Hungary (1560–1614:  A Gothic Horror Poem of Violence and Rage) by Robert Peters.
 The cockerel's waltz by Warwickshire poet Siân Lavinia Anaïs Valeriana, better known by her artist name The Raveness featured her in her 2006 publication Lavinia Volume One 

Comics and manga
The manga Berusaiyu no Bara Gaiden (a side story from The Rose of Versailles) has her story updated to 18th century France and she is confronted by the characters from the main series, Oscar François de Jarjayes and her friends.
In the DC Comics book series Secret Six, the origin of the character Jeannette is revealed. She was taken hostage by Báthory as a young girl and, as the Countess's "favorite", forced to watch every murder with the intent of being Báthory's final victim. However, when the Countess was imprisoned, Jeannette was assigned to care for her and used the position to slowly murder Báthory by placing ground glass in her tea.
 In the anime Vampire Hunter D: Bloodlust, Carmilla is an ancient vampire who resides in the Castle of Chaythe and uses blood to revive her dead body.
 In the manhwa series Horror Collector by Lee So-Young, the protagonist Evilice, a wealthy, beautiful collector of items used for acts of violence (i.e. murder) attempts to resurrect the spirit of Elizabeth Bathory, who sealed herself inside of a doll through a blood bath. However, the ritual is only successful under a full moon. A running gag in the manhwa is that Evilice's jealous boyfriend Sin unsuccessfully attempts to get rid of the doll, seeing it as a threat to his relationship with Evilice. Elizabeth Bathory herself is portrayed in this version as a beautiful and compassionate young maiden, which contrasts with her habit of bathing in the blood of her victims, while her younger teenage self acts as a comic relief character.
 In the Chinese manhwa Journey to the Past by Vivibear, the protagonist Xiao Yin is a time traveler and lives in a tea shop that deal with customers with problems relating to this spiritual ancestors from the past, therefore Xiao Yin travels back in time to ensure that these problems are avoided. In chapter 48, a young girl arrives to the tea shop with a fear of blood; it is found out that the girl has a connection with Elizabeth Bathory, Xiao Yin's mission is to time travel back to Hungary in the year 1560 to meet Bathory and uncover the mystery.
 The 2014 Dynamite Entertainment comics series The Blood Queen by writer Troy Brownfield is based in part on the legend of Bathory, combined with other fantasy elements.
 In the manga and anime Ms. Vampire who lives in my neighborhood. the character "Ellie" is based on her.
 She's appears in the manga Majo Taisen: The War of the Greedy Witches as one of the participants of the Walpurgis.
 In the manga and anime series Ghost Hunt, during the case “The Bloodstained Labyrinth” Elizabeth Bathory is mentioned, as well as the fact that the subject of the case Urado had imitated what Bathory did by killing young people and bathing in their blood hoping to sustain their own life.

Stage plays
 1865 – Báthory Erzsébet:  Történeti szomorújáték, 5 felvonásban  (Erzsébet Báthory:  An Historic Tragedy in Five Acts), by Hungarian poet Zoltán Balogh.
 1975 – Alžbeta Hrozná (Elisabeth the Terrible) or The Krw Story by Stanislav Štepka, produced at Radošinské Naive Theatre in Bratislava, Czechoslovakia.
 1985 – Báthory Erzsébet by Hungarian playwright András Nagy.
 1994 – In the Service of Beauty by Melbourne playwright Sam Sejavka, exploring the final days of the Countess after she has been imprisoned in her castle.
 1995 – Bloody Countess - Take me home tonight, a libretto for ballet by Macedonian playwright Žanina Mirčevska, problematizing cannibalism in the western culture.
 1998 – UNDEAD Dreams of Darkness written and directed by David M. Nevarrez, with characters and situations based on Sheridan Le Fanu's Carmilla and Bram Stoker's Dracula, set in modern times, with Erzsebet Bathory a.k.a. Dr. Nadasdy as the vampire antagonist.
 2000 – Transylvania no Mori – Shin Toujou! Chibimoon wo Mamoru Senshitachi (The Forest of Translyvania  – New Birth! The Soldiers That Protect Chibimoon), a musical from the Sailor Moon musical series (Sera Myu). Elizabeth Bathory was a prominent villain and was depicted as kept alive by being an undead werewolf and posing as an English teacher to trap the Sailor Senshi. She was partnered with another historical serial killer, Gilles de Rais; however, in the 2001 revision her character was replaced by yet another serial killer, Marquise de Brinvilliers.
 2000 – Bathory by Canadian playwright Moynan King.
 2004 – Erzsebet by Michael Stever, with Amy LeBlanc. First exhibited in 2004 at The American Theatre For Actors, Chernuchin Theatre, NYC. 'Erzsebet' By Michael Stever – Table Read Preview
 2005 – Vampyress, an opera written by Chad Salvata, with Melissa Vogt as Erzsebet Bathori.  It was produced by Ethos Performance Troupe in association with the VORTEX Repertory Company in Austin, Texas.  Vampyress was revived in 2010, Vogt (now Vogt-Patterson) replaying her role as the Bloody Countess.
 2007 – Bathory: The Blood Countess, written by John DiDonna and produced by The Empty Spaces Theatre Co.
 2010 – Bathory: A new musical music and lyrics by David Levinson, book by Daniel Levinson, produced at the 45th Street Theater and Ripley Grier Studios
 2021 – Báthory, monologue written by Carlos Atanes. Performed as dramatized reading at Biblioteca del Soho, Madrid, in 2021.

Television
 The fifth season of American Horror Story featured a character loosely based on Elizabeth Báthory named Countess Elizabeth Johnson, portrayed by Lady Gaga, who slits the throats of her victims in order to drink their blood and remain eternally young. She also turned her adopted children, the Towheads, and her lovers Tristan, Donovan, and Ramona into vampires as well. It was revealed that in the year 1926, she was a silent screen actress who became inflicted with a virus that makes its victims act like vampires, which was brought onto her by her lovers Rudolph Valentino and Natacha Rambova.
 Batoria from School for Vampires is named after her.
 The second episode of the second season of the Amazon Prime series Lore recounts the tale of Countess Elizabeth Báthory. English actress Maimie McCoy portrays Báthory.
 The second season of the WGN America show Salem featured a character named Countess Palatine Ingrid von Marburg (Lucy Lawless), who is inspired by (and claims to have once been known as) Elizabeth Báthory.

Film
There have been numerous films about, referring to, or containing characters based on Countess Elizabeth Báthory:

 1970 – Necropolis (Franco Brocani), with Viva Auder as "Countess Bathory"
 1971 – Countess Dracula (Peter Sasdy), with Ingrid Pitt as "Countess Elisabeth"
 1971 – Daughters of Darkness (Harry Kümel), with Delphine Seyrig as "Countess Bathory"
 1973 – Legend of Blood Castle (Ceremonia sangrienta) (Jorge Grau), with Lucia Bosé as "Erzebeth Bathory"
 1973 – Curse of the Devil (Carlos Aured), with Maria Silva as "Elizabeth Bathory"
 1973 – Immoral Tales (Walerian Borowczyk), with Paloma Picasso as "Elisabeth Bathory"
 1979 – Thirst (Rod Hardy), starring Chantal Contouri as a lineal descendant of Elizabeth Bathory
 1980 – Krvavá Pani (The Bloody Lady) (Viktor Kubal) (animated)
 1980 – Mama Dracula (Boris Szulzinger), with Louise Fletcher as "Mama Dracula"
 1981 – Night of the Werewolf (Paul Naschy), with Julia Saly as "Countess Elisabeth Bathory"
 1981 – The Tyrant's Heart (Miklós Jancsó)
 1988 – The Mysterious Death of Nina Chereau (Dennis Berry)
 1999 – Bloodbath (Dan Speaker, Kim Turney)
 2000 – Bathory (Brian Topping)
 2000 – Alguien mató algo (Jorge Navas)
 2000 – La historia de Elizabeth Bathory (Leonardo Carreño)
 2002 – Killer Love (Lloyd A. Simandl)
 2004 – Tomb of the Werewolf (Fred Olen Ray)
 2004 – Eternal (Wilhelm Liebenberg, Federico Sanchez)
 2005 – The Brothers Grimm (Ehren Kruger, Terry Gilliam) the Mirror Queen
 2005 – Night Fangs (Ricardo Islas), with Marina Muzychenko as "Countess Elizabeth Bathory"
 2006 – Stay Alive (William Brent Bell), with Maria Kalinina as the "Countess"
 2006 – Demon's Claw (Lloyd A. Simandl) (video), with Kira Reed as "Elizabeth Bathory"
 2006 – Bram Stoker's Dracula's Curse (Leigh Scott), with Christina Rosenberg as "Countess Ezabet Bathorly"
 2006 – Metamorphosis (Jenő Hódi)
 2007 – Blood Scarab (Donald F. Glut) (video), with Monique Parent as "Countess Elizabeth Bathory"
 2007 – Hellboy: Blood and Iron (Victor Cook and Tad Stones), an animated TV movie with Kath Soucie voicing the character of "Erszebet Ondrushko"
 2007 – Hostel: Part II (Eli Roth), with Monika Malacova as "Mrs. Bathory"
 2008 – Bathory: Countess of Blood (Juraj Jakubisko), starring Anna Friel as "Erzsébet Báthory"
 2009 – The Countess (Julie Delpy), starring Delpy as "Erzsebet Bathory"
 2010 - The Báthory Legend (Hungarian TV series directed by Gábor N. Forgács).
 2010 – 30 Days of Night: Dark Days – (Steve Niles, Ben Ketai) - The queen vampire Lilith (Mia Kirshner) is based on Elizabeth Báthory as she is featured bathing in human blood in one scene.  
 2012 - Abraham Lincoln: Vampire Hunter, Blu-ray edition, has an animated deleted scene The Great Calamity, depicting Elizabeth Bathory, who does not speak. In the feature film, Bathory is not mentioned.
 2012 - Snow White and the Huntsman (Rupert Sanders) - Queen Ravenna (Charlize Theron) is loosely inspired by Elizabeth Bathory, but instead of bathing in human blood, she magically consumes her victims' youth and beauty, in order to survive.
 2013 – Epitaph: Bread and Salt (Nathyn Brendan Masters), with Kaylee Williams as "Liz Bathory"
 2013 – Chastity Bites (John V. Knowles), with Louise Griffiths as "Liz Batho/Elizabeth Bathory"
 2013 – Fright Night 2: New Blood, with Jaime Murray as Gerri Dandridge, a vampire (who is actually Elizabeth Bathory)
 2014 – Documentary Movie (Pavel Novotny) 400 Years of bloody Countess - The secret behind the secret 2015 – Salem: Bloodbath 2015 – Lady of Csejte (Blood Countess, U.K. title) with Svetlana Khodchenkova as Elizabeth Bathory.
 2016 - Blood of the Tribades - The setting is called Bathory and the long last leader the villagers worship is named Bathor
 2016 – The Neon Demon - The characters of Ruby, Sarah and Gigi are based on Elizabeth Báthory.

Radio
 The Canadian Broadcasting Corporation's supernatural series Nightfall ran a two-part dramatization on the atrocities of Báthory called Blood Countess in 1980.

Video games
The bloodbath myth served as a major component of some games:

A character based on Elizabeth Báthory, named Elizabeth Bartley, appears in the video game Castlevania: Bloodlines released in 1994. Elisabeth Báthory she appears as the main antagonist of the game as Dracula's niece, who died in the early 16th century but was revived 300 years later, just before World War I. In the game's backstory, she was the one who orchestrated the assassination of Archduke Franz Ferdinand, which led to the war as a means to revive Dracula. She is fought as the penultimate boss of the game, just before facing the final boss (Dracula) in the last level Castle Proserpina.
A fan-made, five-mission campaign for Thief II: The Metal Age on PC.
In the MMORPG Ragnarok Online, Bathories are witch-like enemies fought on the 4th basement floor of Clock Tower.
In the MMORPG DarkEden, Lady Elizabeth Bathory is a game "boss" alongside Lord Vlad Tepes, who players are able to kill in an instanced level known as a "lair".
In the MMORPG Atlantica Online, Countess Elizabeth Bathory is the boss of the dungeon Bran Castle alongside Lord Vlad Dracula.
"The Countess" is a super unique monster from Blizzard Entertainment's popular dungeon-crawler Diablo 2. The following passage is read in a rotting tome and initiates the quest:
In the video game  Fate/Extra CCC, the new Lancer Servant is based on Báthory as a Heroic Spirit.
She also appears in the game Fate/Grand Order as a Lancer, and later as five event servants for Halloween, Elizabeth Bathory [Halloween] as a Caster, Elizabeth Bathory [Brave] as a Saber, Elizabeth Bathory [Cinderella] as a Rider and a robotic Alter Ego version called "Mecha Eli-chan" that also has a "Mk. II" counterpart. While the Saber, Caster, Rider and Lancer servants are based on her 14-year-old self, an Assassin and Rider servant with the alias of "Carmilla" is her own existence in her adult age, succumbing over her dark side. The younger Elizabeth despises her older self, and wishes to never become like her, instead enjoying being a JPOP idol.
In the multiplatform game Fate/Extella she appears in the same form as in  Fate/Extra CCC; however, as several servants severe liberties are taken, such as making her into a JPOPesque singer, a further departure from the semi-realistic portrayal of historical and fictional characters of the early TYPE-moon games from the fate franchise.
In the video game Vampire Hunter D, the main antagonist addresses herself as Elizabeth Bartley Carmilla, also referencing the title character of Sheridan Le Fanu's novella Carmilla.
The PC game Born Into Darkness features a chapter based on Báthory and the idea that Vlad the Impaler had given Elizabeth and her husband the Shroud of Lazarus.
The Butcheress from the video game BloodRayne claims to be her descendant.
In the video game Resident Evil Village, antagonist Alcina Dimitrescu bears strong resemblance to Báthory, and takes sadistic pleasure in torturing her victims before killing them and drinking their blood,
In the video game Ninja Gaiden 2, the female villain named Elizabet is seen bathing nude in a pool of blood and her demonic power seems to be that of using blood to attack her foes.
In the role-playing game Nightlife, Báthory appears as a Vampyre NPC living under the alias Lisa "Blood" Bath. She is the lead for an unsigned hardcore/heavy metal band called Krypt.
In the 2010 role-playing video game expansion Dragon Age: Origins – Awakening, a Baroness (dead at the time the game takes place) abducts and kills young female villagers and uses their blood for rejuvenating rituals.
In the 2004 PlayStation 2 videogame  Primal, there is a young Elizabeth in a Carpathian castle who seems destined to grow up to be Elizabeth Báthory.
In Mortal Kombat, the Fatality Tutorial mentions Elizabeth Báthory as the DLC character Skarlet's favorite historical figure, due to the character's blood-based powers.
The indefinitely halted video game Shadows of the Eternal was intended to have Elizabeth Báthory as a major character and possible villain, with the main protagonist Clara being a handmaiden and lover/confidante of her.
In the PC game Vampire Legends: The Untold Story of Elizabeth Bathory (2014) a young gypsy "finder" is hired to find a woman who went missing after going to work for Elizabeth Báthory.
In the Mass Effect series, a female human plastic surgeon named Erzsebet Vidmar killed 30 Asari to harvest a genetic compound which is responsible for slowing the aging process, in an attempt to access the thousand-year lifespan Asari are known for.
While Báthory does not appear directly in the game, one of the villains in Fire Emblem Gaiden and its remake Fire Emblem Echoes: Shadows of Valentia is the witch Nuibaba; she would kidnap young, beautiful women and sacrifice them to attain eternal beauty, somewhat in a similar vein to Elizabeth Báthory.
In For Honor, The name of the playable female Black Prior is Erzabet. Erzabet is the Hungarian form of Elizabeth, and likely references Elizabeth Báthory.
The Tekken series features a playable female vampire character named Eliza, possibly short for Elizabeth.
 In Warframe, Garuda, a warframe based around gore and blood, has an alternate helmet called "Bathory" which is a nod towards Elizabeth Báthory.

Toys
Báthory is featured in McFarlane Toys' 6 Faces of Madness series, a collection of action figures which also includes Jack the Ripper,
Rasputin and Vlad the Impaler. Báthory is depicted bathing in blood while the heads of some of her victims are impaled in a candelabrum. Bathory was also made as a doll in the Living Dead Dolls series.

The card game Evil Baby Orphanage includes Lady Báthory as a character; she is shown in a bathtub with pink water.

In the board game The Harbingers, which is part of the Atmosfear series of interactive video board games, Elizabeth Bathory was one of the six playable harbingers in the game, portrayed as a vampiress. Prior to that, she had her own added expansion set to the first Atmosfear game; Nightmare.

Music
 "Elizabeth", song by Swedish rock band Ghost from the album Opus Eponymous.
 Elizabetta (2019), opera in two acts by Gabriel Prokofiev, with libretto by David Pountney, premiered in Regensburg, Germany, 2019.
 Báthory Erzsébet (2012), Hungarian musical-opera by composers György Szomor and Péter Pejtsik, with libretto by Tibor Miklós.
 Countess Báthory (Báthoryčka), is a 1994 opera by the Slovakian composer Ilja Zeljenka, with libretto by Peter Maťo, after Jonáš Záborský.
 The Lady of Čachtice (Čachtická pani) is a 1931 opera by the Czech composer Miloš Smatek, with libretto in Slovak by Quido Maria Vyskočil and Elena Krčmáryová.
 Erzsebet is an opera by French composer Charles Chaynes.
 The black metal band Murder Rape make reference to Elizabeth Báthory in their song "Mistress of the Gloomy Nights" from their only album Evil Shall Burn Inside Me Forever (2001).A Bestia: Báthory Erzsébet véres legendája (The Beast:  The Bloody Legend of Erzsébet Báthory) is a Hungarian rock opera by Béla Szakcsi Lakatos and Géza Csemer.Báthory Erzsébet, opera (premiered in Budapest, 1913) by Hungarian composer Sándor Szeghő (1874–1956).
"Elisabetha", song by Gothic metal band Darkwell. There are two versions of this song, one with Stephanie Luzie as vocalist.Erzsébet: Elizabeth Bathory: The Opera is by Dennis Báthory-Kitsz (he claims he may be related to her).
 The extreme metal band Cradle of Filth dedicated their album Cruelty and the Beast (1998) entirely to her, telling her story with a certain degree of artistic license, but keeping the main details of her story intact. There are two versions of the album cover, both feature a woman bathed in a tub of blood. References to Elizabeth Báthory occur throughout the band's work.
 The German band Untoten have released a concept album about her, called Die Blutgräfin.
 French singer Juliette (Nourredine) mentions La Bathory in her song "Tueuses" from her 1996 album Rimes Féminines along with numerous famous female criminals.
 Australian/Japanese unit GPKISM have released two EPs about Báthory, Barathrum (meaning Hell) and Iudicium (meaning fate, judgement or trial).
 Russian black metal band Messiya had released an EP dedicated to her called Erzebet in the year 2009.
 Channeling of Lady Elizabeth Bathory is a live album by multigenre jam band Stefanik, Perny & Kollar featuring Kofi recorded in Višňové village, under Čachtice Castle in 2010.
 Underground hip-hop artist Killah Priest named his album Elizabeth in reference to her.
 Music label Erzsebet Records take its name from her.
 Warwickshire poet and harpsichordist, Siân Lavinia Anaïs Valeriana released an extended play under her nom de plume 'The Raveness' entitled Eat the heart in the year 2006, based around Báthory.

Songs about Elizabeth Báthory include:
 "Blood Countess" by The Fiendish Phantoms (2017).
 "Countess Bathory" by the English black metal band Venom, from their highly influential album Black Metal.
 "Woman of Dark Desires" by the Swedish black metal band Bathory, from the album Under the Sign of the Black Mark.
 "Beauty Through Order" is by the American thrash metal band Slayer, from the album World Painted Blood.
 "Channeling Of Lady Elizabeth Bathory" is a live composition by Slovak experimental band Stefanik, Perny & Kollar feat. Kofi from second album Channeling Of Lady Elizabeth Bathory.
 "Elizabeth" is a song by progressive symphonic metal band Kamelot composed of three parts – "Part I: Mirror Mirror", "Part II: Requiem for the Innocent" and "Part III: Fall From Grace", from their 2001 album Karma.
 "Elizabeth" by Czech Gothic rock band XIII Stoleti, from the album Ztraceni v Karpatech (1998).
 "Elisabeth Bathory" by Hungarian black metal band Tormentor, which was covered by Swedish black metal band Dissection.
 "Elizabeth" by Swedish heavy metal band Ghost from their debut album Opus Eponymous.
 "Bathory's Sainthood" by American hardcore band Boy Sets Fire (2003).
 "Báthory Erzsébet" by experimental doom metal band Sunn O))) is a cover of "A Fine Day To Die" by Bathory.
 "Countess Erzsebet Nadasdy" by Finnish black metal band Barathrum.
 "Villa Vampiria" by death metal band God Dethroned.
 "Transylvanian Pearl" by Russian metal band Nocticula.
"Queen of Heresy" by German black and thrash metal band Cruel Force.
 "The Blood Countess" by Indian blackened death metal band Diabolical Bloodshed.
 "Buried Dreams", the title track from the 1987 album of the same name by the British industrial band Clock DVA, sing-speaks to Elizabeth Báthory in her prison cell after being convicted of her crimes, wondering what she thinks about her past.
 "Erzsebet" by dance-punk artist Jay Tea (2007).
 "Torquemada 71", by English stoner metal band Electric Wizard, from the album Witchcult Today.
 "The Bleeding Baroness" by the metal band Candlemass from their album Death Magic Doom (2009), featuring Robert Lowe on vocals, shows some similarities to Countess Báthory's story.  Additionally, Candlemass, featuring Messiah Marcolin on vocals, had also released a single/cover version of the Venom song, "Countess Bathory".
 "Resurrection" and "Schwarzer Engel" by Spanish Gothic metal band Forever Slave tell the story of Erzsebet Báthory.
 "Bathe in Blood" by Evile (taken from 2007's Enter the Grave).
 "Rose of Pain" from the album Blue Blood by X Japan.
 The song "An Execution", a B-side on the "Cities in Dust" single by Siouxsie and the Banshees, was based on the "myth" of Countess Báthory. Banshees guitarist John Valentine Carruthers states, "She (Siouxsie) was reading this book about Countess Bathory, called Was Dracula A Woman? or something. She used to (sic.) bath in the blood of virgins in the vain hope it would keep you young".
 The song "Transylvanian Bloodlust" by Canadian black metal band Funeral Fog from their album Under The Black Veil 2003.
 "Lady Liz" by Italian heavy metal/hard rock band Viper Kiss.
 "Elizabeth" by Ukrainian Gothic/neoclassical band Emelyan XIII, from the EP Viata De Moarte 2010
 "The Wrath of Satan's Whore" by Dutch black metal band Countess.
 "Salva Me" by Norwegian doom metal band The 3rd and the Mortal.
 "Sweet Elizabeth" by New York band Valley Lodge.
 "The Soul of Lizbeth" by English black metal band Angmaer.
 The third section of the song "Steroids (Crouching Tiger Hidden Gabber)" by Death Grips, popularly known as "Bald Head Girl", mentions her.
 "The Iron Maiden and the Dreamy Princess" featuring Kagamine Rin by Japanese Vocaloid producer Ankoku DouwaP

Bands named after Elizabeth Báthory include:
 The influential Swedish black metal band Bathory take their name from Elizabeth, and mention her in some songs, one being "Woman of Dark Desires".
 The Ohio hardcore/thrash band, Erzsebet Bathory, take their name from Elizabeth.
 The Dutch black metal band Countess take their band name from Elizabeth's title. They also covered the song Countess Bathory, originally by Venom.
 American band Ellsbeth take their name from Elizabeth. They released a concept album about her named Well Dressed Killing Machine in 2009.
 German heavy metal band Elisabetha take their name from her.
 Mexican heavy metal band Erzsebeth take their name from her and released a concept album about her named La Condesa Inmortal'' in 2007.
 Colombian black metal band Erzebet take their name from her.
 American Gothic metal band Erzebet take their name from her.

References

Further reading